AWS is Amazon Web Services, a cloud computing and web services provider.

AWS or Aws may also refer to:

Technology

 Advanced Wireless Services, spectrum band used for mobile services in America
 Apple Workgroup Server
 Automatic Warning System, a signalling and safety system used on British railways
 Autonomous Web Services, via the World Wide Web
 Automatic weather station

Organisations

 Alien Workshop, a skateboard company
 American Welding Society
 Association of Women Surgeons
 Austria Wirtschaftsservice Gesellschaft, an Austrian bank
 AWS Shopper, a German manufacturer of microcar
 Solidarity Electoral Action (Akcja Wyborcza Solidarność), a political party coalition in Poland

Military

 Aircraft Warning Service, a former civilian service of the United States Army Ground Observer Corps
 Affordable Weapon System, a US Navy cruise missile system in a shipping container
 American War Standard, a plan for the electronic color code of small radio parts
 Arctic Warfare Suppressed, an internally suppressed bolt-action sniper rifle
 Autonomous Weapon System aka Lethal autonomous weapon

Music

 A Wilhelm Scream, a punk rock band from Massachusetts
 A Wilhelm Scream (EP), a 2009 record by the band
 American Wind Symphony
 AWS (band), Hungarian metal band

Other uses

 South Awyu language (ISO 639-3 code: aws) 
 Afrikaanse Woordelys en Spelreëls, the Afrikaans Word List and Spelling Rules publication
 All-women shortlist
 Associate Writer to the Signet, a membership level in the Society of Writers to Her Majesty's Signet
 Banu Aws (Sons of Aws), a tribe in Mohammad's era
 Alternative work schedule, a kind of flexitime used in certain U.S. government agencies
 Alcohol withdrawal syndrome